Kai Bülow (born 31 May 1986) is a German former professional footballer who most recently played as a defender for Hansa Rostock.

Career
In July 2018, Bülow returned to former club Hansa Rostock signing a two-year contract.

In June 2020, Bülow announced he would retire from playing at the end of the 2019–20 season.

Personal life
Growing up his favourite team was VfB Stuttgart and his favourite player was Patrick Vieira. He stated that he would love to play for Arsenal some day.

Career statistics

References

External links
 
 

1986 births
Living people
Association football midfielders
German footballers
Germany under-21 international footballers
FC Hansa Rostock players
TSV 1860 Munich players
Karlsruher SC players
Bundesliga players
2. Bundesliga players
3. Liga players
Sportspeople from Rostock